Tun Azmi bin Mohamed was the former Lord President of the Federal Court. His son, Zaki Azmi was the sixth Chief Justice of Malaysia.

Honours

Honours of Malaysia
  : 
 Commander of the Order of the Defender of the Realm (PMN) – Tan Sri (1967)
 Grand Commander of the Order of Loyalty to the Crown of Malaysia (SSM) – Tun (1970)

References 

 

Date of death unknown
Malaysian people of Malay descent
Malaysian Muslims
20th-century Malaysian judges
Chief justices of Malaysia
Grand Commanders of the Order of Loyalty to the Crown of Malaysia
Commanders of the Order of the Defender of the Realm